The 1901 Svenska Mästerskapet was the sixth season of Svenska Mästerskapet, the football Cup to determine the Swedish champions. AIK won the tournament due to Örgryte IS II leaving a walkover in the final.

Semi-finals

Final

Notes

References 

Print

1901
Mas
Svenska